Haswell is a village in County Durham, in England.

Haswell was the birthplace of world champion road racing cyclist Tom Simpson, born 30 November 1937, who died aged 29 on Mont Ventoux during the 1967 Tour de France.

It was also the home of the first coal mine in the world with a steel cable down its mine shaft.

Coal
Coal was discovered in the early 19th century.

References

External links

www.geograph.co.uk : photos of Haswell and surrounding area

 
Villages in County Durham
Civil parishes in County Durham
1844 disasters in the United Kingdom
1844 in England
Coal mining disasters in England
1844 mining disasters